Elliot Panicco (born November 18, 1996) is an American professional soccer player who plays as a goalkeeper for Major League Soccer club Nashville SC.

Career

Youth and college 
In December 2014, Panicco graduated high school early and enrolled at UNC Charlotte during the Spring 2015 semester. Panicco played with the men's soccer team during their spring 2015 exhibitions. During the 2015 NCAA Division I men's soccer season, his freshman year, Panicco was redshirted for the season. Starting his sophomore year, Panicco became a four-year starter for the 49ers program, amassing a total of 77 appearances for the team, as well as earning one assist during his college career.

Panicco made his college soccer debut on August 29, 2016 in a 6–0 victory against Hofstra, where he would record his first career shutout, and make four saves during the match. Panicco would then go on to register three consecutive shutouts following the victory over Hofstra. On September 17, 2016, during a conference slate against Old Dominion, Panicco would register his first, and only, collegiate assist, helping Charlotte prevail to a 2–0 victory. In total, Panicco made eight shutouts during his freshman campaign. He finished the 2016 season with a goalkeeping record of 12–4–2. Concluding the 2016 Conference USA men's soccer season, Panicco was named the Conference USA Men's Soccer Freshman of the Year and named to the Conference USA All-First Team.

In 2017, in his second year, Panicco helped Charlotte reach the championship match of the 2017 Conference USA Men's Soccer Tournament, where they ultimately lost to Old Dominion. In his third-year, Panicco won the Conference USA Golden Glove Award and was featured twice on the TopDrawerSoccer.com national team of the week. Panicco was also named to the NCCSIA All-State Team. In his senior season, Panicco won the Senior CLASS Award for men's soccer.

Professional
On January 9, 2020, Panicco was selected 13th overall in the 2020 MLS SuperDraft by Nashville SC after the team traded up for the pick. Panicco signed with Nashville on February 25, 2020.

Austin Bold
Pannico was loaned to USL Championship side Austin Bold on May 6, 2021, alongside Nashville SC teammate Nick Hinds. He made his professional debut for the club on May 21, 2021 in a 1–1 draw against Real Monarchs.

Honors

Individual 
 Senior CLASS Award: 2019
David Schlee Memorial Award: 2017
Conference USA Golden Glove: 2019
 Conference USA Golden Glove: 2018
Conference USA Golden Glove: 2016
 Conference USA Men's Soccer Freshman of the Year: 2016
All Conference USA 1st Team: 2019
All Conference USA 1st Team: 2018
All Conference USA 1st Team: 2016
All Conference USA Freshman Team: 2016

References

External links 
Elliot Panicco at UNC Charlotte

1996 births
Living people
American soccer players
American people of Italian descent
Association football goalkeepers
Austin Bold FC players
Charlotte 49ers men's soccer players
Indy Eleven players
Nashville SC players
Nashville SC draft picks
People from Huntersville, North Carolina
Soccer players from North Carolina
Soccer players from Kentucky
USL Championship players
Major League Soccer players